HMS Neasham (M2712/IMS49) was a  for the Royal Navy. The names of the Ham-class vessels were all chosen from villages ending in -ham. HMS Neasham was named after Neasham in County Durham.

Despite being completed on 15 November 1957, Neasham was held in operational reserve in a land cradle at Rosneath on the Clyde until 1967.  She was then transferred to the Royal Australian Navy, arriving in Sydney as deck cargo on the merchant ship Gladstone Star on 29 July 1968.

After a period at the RAN base at Garden Island, New South Wales, Neasham was converted into a diving tender and renamed HMAS Porpoise (DTV 1002/Y.280) on 13 June 1973. Porpoise was sold in 1989 to property developer Keith Williams, owner of Sea World on the Gold Coast, Queensland, Australia.  She was later converted into a luxury motor yacht and renamed Achilles III.

References

Blackman, R.V.B. ed. Jane's Fighting Ships (1953)

Ham-class minesweepers
Ships built on the Isle of Wight
1956 ships
Cold War minesweepers of the United Kingdom
Royal Navy ship names